This event was held on Sunday 30 January 2011 as part of the 2011 UCI Cyclo-cross World Championships in Sankt Wendel, Germany.

Ranking

Notes

External links
 Union Cycliste Internationale

Men's elite race
UCI Cyclo-cross World Championships – Men's elite race